Sama Technical and Vocational Training College of Mashhad, is affiliated to Islamic Azad University, Mashhad Branch. It was established in 2003, and at the first step, this unit started its educational activities specially providing associate degree programs and technical courses for 388 students in two fields in accounting and computer.

Description
Sama Technical and Vocational Training College of Mashhad has the largest campus among all branches of Sama colleges in Iran with about 16300 square meters infrastructure. There are labs and studios that are well-equipped.

Currently, this unit has 32 full-time faculty members, 180 experienced invited lecturers and 3200 students studying in 13 various associate degree programs.

This college holds various workshops by exploiting several specialized and well-equipped laboratories on the Electrical programs (such as General Electronic workshops, Electric-machine laboratories, Industrial power circuit, Power circuit and measuring), in addition to Industrial PLC, Hydraulics, Pneumatics and Winding laboratories on Automotive Mechanics program, besides spacious and well-prepared studios and workshops for Surveying, Graphic, and Architecture groups.

Furthermore, Sama Technical and Vocational training College of Mashhad is equipped with several computer sites and a library which contains 14000 reference books and volumes. The students can develop their knowledge, skills and social capabilities while participating in different scientific, cultural, sport and research activities in this provided circumstance.

Sama Deputy Background
Mashhad Sama Deputy of Mashhad affiliated to Islamic Azad University, Mashhad Branch was founded in 1992 first by establishing two all-girls high schools and enrolling 165 students. Now, it runs 12 pioneer single-gender schools with more than 2500 students combined, in addition to four foreign language institutes with 2250 language learners as well as a specialized technical and Vocational training college focusing on providing 3200 students with 13 various associate degree programs.

References 

Educational institutions established in 1992
Universities in Iran
1992 establishments in Iran